Mercy High School is a private and independent Catholic high school for girls sponsored by the Sisters of Mercy and is located within the Archdiocese of Baltimore on a 26-acre campus at 1300 East Northern Parkway in Baltimore, Maryland. It is the only Catholic girls' school in Baltimore City with playing fields onsite.

History
Founded in 1960, Mercy High School is located on a 26-acre campus in Northeast Baltimore. Opened at the request of the Archbishop of Baltimore who saw a need for a large, modern, centrally located Catholic high school for girls, Mercy High School was established in anticipation of the entrance of the first wave of baby boomers born in 1946. More than 300 students entered Mercy as freshmen in 1960. Today, students from more than 64 ZIP codes throughout Central Maryland and Southern Pennsylvania attend Mercy.

Accreditation and Sponsorship
Mercy is an International Baccalaureate World School authorized to offer the Middle years Programme. The school is a member of the Association of Independent Maryland & DC Schools (AIMS) and the Mercy Education System of the Americas (MESA), the network of schools under the auspices of the Institute of the Sisters of Mercy of the Americas.

Athletics
The Mercy Magic compete in the Inter-Scholastic Athletic Association (IAAM). Mercy offers 17 IAAM teams in 12 different sports that compete against many of the toughest teams in the state. Both the Varsity Basketball and Varsity Lacrosse teams won the IAAM "B" Conference Championships in the 2021-2022 school year, with Varsity Softball finishing runner-up in their IAAM "B" Conference Championship. Nike is providing uniforms for athletes in the 2022-2023 school year.

Mercy's longest sports rivalry was with the now-closed Institute of Notre Dame (IND), a Catholic girls' high school that was sponsored by the School Sisters of Notre Dame. Each year since 1961 the two schools' basketball teams played in a match-up known to fans simply as "The Game." It was the best-attended high school girls' sporting event in the state of Maryland. When "The Game" ended in 2019, the series stood at Mercy 30, IND 23. In February 2022, a new basketball rivalry with Maryvale Preparatory School was established. Mercy won the first game, taking home the Rita Sloan Berndt Memorial Trophy, named in memory of a distinguished IND alumna.

In September 2019, the school inaugurated its new $4.3 million Sisters of Mercy Athletic Complex. The lighted, AstroTurf field has a digital video scoreboard with bleachers and seating area accommodating up to 2,000 fans, for use by the school's soccer, field hockey, and lacrosse teams.

Mercy's school colors are red and white, and the magician and rabbit serve as mascots.

Student life
Mercy has 34 clubs and students organizations, including Asian Student Union, Black Student Union, Craft Club, Ethics Team, Model Diplomats, Peer Ministry, and Social Justice Society.

Beatlemania
On September 14, 1964, George Harrison visited Mercy the day after the Beatles played a concert in the city. A plaque placed above the fountain from which he drank from says Harrison’s visit was “the only known visit by a member of the group to an American high school during the height of Beatlemania.” Frank Lidinsky, who commissioned the plaque, verified the information by email with Beatles historian, Mark Lewisohn.

Notable alumnae
 The Honorable Carol Smith '64, Retired Associate Judge, Baltimore City Circuit Court, 8th Judicial Circuit, and Principal, Creative Dispute Resolutions, LLC 
Lynne Spigelmire Viti, '65, JD, PhD, lecturer emerita, The Writing Program, Wellesley College. Poet & writer: The Walk to Cefalù (2022); Dancing at Lake Montebello: (2020), Going Too Fast: Stories (2020), The Glamorganshire Bible (2018), Baltimore Girls (2017).
 The Honorable Mary Ellen Santiago Barbera '69, retired Chief Judge of the Maryland Court of Appeals 
 Patricia Gonce Morton, PhD, RN, ACNP-BC, FAAN '70, Dean, College of Nursing, University of Utah
 Donna Orem '72, President, National Association of Independent Schools (NAIS)
 Mary Claire Helldorfer '72 (aka Elizabeth Chandler, Kissed by an Angel), young adult, children's author
 Stephanie Beran '76, retired Managing Director, Legg Mason
 Kimberly Clark '76, Executive Vice-President, Baltimore Development Corporation 
 Lenora Henry '88, Executive Director, Baltimore City Chamber of Commerce
 Lisa Ferretto '92, Principal, Architect, and Sustainability Director, Hord Coplan Macht 
 Dr. Kia Myrick McDaniel '95, Director of Curriculum and Instruction, Prince George's County Public Schools
 Heather Stansbury '97 Lawyer in Ocean City, focusing on Criminal Law, Family Law, and Litigation cases.  
 Ashley Valis '00, Chief Operating Officer, Catholic Charities of Baltimore
 Kristen Carr '06, Member, U.S. National Women's Lacrosse Team and Assistant Coach, Stanford University Women's Lacrosse Team
 Ashley Kowalski '07, NASA astronaut selected to participate in NASA mission SIRIUS-21 as part of a multinational crew living together for eight months while NASA researchers study the effects of isolation and confinement on the human body and team dynamics
 Unissa Cruse '10, actor and dancer, appearing in Hairspray Live!
 Menu'ette Silver '13, co-writer and co-producer, "The Dope Years: The Story of Latasha Harlins," winner of a Student Academy Award for Best Documentary Short.

See also

National Catholic Educational Association

References

External links
 Mercy High School Website
 Roman Catholic Archdiocese of Baltimore

Catholic secondary schools in Maryland
Private schools in Baltimore
Middle States Commission on Secondary Schools
Girls' schools in Maryland
Educational institutions established in 1960
1960 establishments in Maryland
Sisters of Mercy schools